Bishop Guido Bentivoglio, C.R. (died 1680) was a Roman Catholic prelate who served as Bishop of Bertinoro (1660–1676).

Biography
Guido Bentivoglio was ordained a priest in the Congregation of Clerics Regular of the Divine Providence.
On 16 Feb 1660, he was appointed during the papacy of Pope Alexander VII as Bishop of Bertinoro.
On 23 Feb 1660, he was consecrated bishop by Carlo Pio di Savoia, Cardinal-Deacon of Santa Maria in Domnica, with Giuseppe Sanfelice, Archbishop of Cosenza, and Carlo Stefano Anastasio Ciceri, Bishop of Alessandria della Paglia, serving as co-consecrators. 
He served as Bishop of Bertinoro until his resignation on 1 Feb 1676. 
He died on 1 Feb 1680.

Episcopal succession
While bishop, he was the principal co-consecrator of:
Bonifazio Albani, Archbishop of Split (1668);
Rodolpho Acquaviva, Titular Bishop of Laodicea in Phrygia and Apostolic Nuncio to Switzerland (1668);
Gianfrancesco Riccamonti, Bishop of Cervia (1668);
Teodoro Gennaro, Bishop of Krk (1668); and
Nicola Lepori, Bishop of Saluzzo (1668).

References

External links and additional sources
 (for Chronology of Bishops) 
 (for Chronology of Bishops) 

17th-century Italian Roman Catholic bishops
Bishops appointed by Pope Alexander VII
1680 deaths
Theatine bishops